East Bengal Club is an Indian association football club based in Kolkata, West Bengal, which competes in the top tier of Indian football. The club was formed in August 1920 when the Jorabagan Club's vice-president,  Suresh Chandra Chaudhuri, resigned. He did so after the club sent out their starting eleven with the notable exclusion of defender Sailesh Bose, who was dropped from the squad for undisclosed reasons when they were about to face Mohun Bagan in the Coochbehar Cup semi-final on 28 July 1920. He, along with Raja Manmatha Nath Chaudhuri, Ramesh Chandra Sen and Aurobinda Ghosh, formed East Bengal on 1 August 1920. East Bengal started playing in the Calcutta Football League, 2nd division, in 1921. In 1925, they qualified for the first division for the first time and since then they have won many Indian football titles.

East Bengal joined the National Football League (NFL) at its inception in 1996 and is the only club to have played every season to date, including those after the rebranded I-League succeeded the NFL in 2007. East Bengal won the National Football League in 2000–01, 2002–03 and 2003–04 and were runners up seven times, the most by any Indian football club. Among other trophies, East Bengal has won the Calcutta Football League 39 times, the IFA Shield 28 times, the Federation Cup eight times and the Durand Cup 16 times.

There have been ninety-six different captains officially announced by the club. This chronological list comprises the East Bengal captains since their foundation in 1920. Every captain's entry includes the season in which the player was officially declared as the captain of the team by the club and his nationality.

List of East Bengal captains
The list of captains for East Bengal:

References

External links
 Official website

East Bengal Club related lists